Celta Vigo contested La Liga and the Copa del Rey in the 1993–94 season. They placed 15th in La Liga, four places lower than the previous season. However, they excelled in the Copa del Rey, reaching the final for the first time since 1948 before losing on penalties to Real Zaragoza.

Squad

Left club during season

Squad stats 
Last updated on 2 March 2021.

|-
|colspan="14"|Players who have left the club after the start of the season:

|}

Results

La Liga

League table

Matches

Copa del Rey

Third round 

Celta Vigo won 2–1 on aggregate

Fourth round 

Celta Vigo won 5–4 on aggregate

Fifth round 

Celta Vigo won 2–1 on aggregate

Round of 16 

1–1 on aggregate. Celta Vigo won 4–3 on penalties

Quarter-finals 

Celta Vigo won 5–1 on aggregate

Semi-finals 

Celta Vigo won 5–2 on aggregate

Final

References

External links 
Spain 1993/94 at RSSSF

RC Celta de Vigo seasons
Celta